DHFS may refer to:
 Dihydrofolate synthase, an enzyme
 Defence Helicopter Flying School
 Dronfield Henry Fanshawe School